The Ibanez DMM1 was an electric guitar model manufactured by Ibanez.

The guitar was designed in a partnership with System of a Down's guitarist, Daron Malakian.

The DMM1 signature model was based on the Ibanez Iceman ICX models, used by Malakian in the past. All DMM1 guitars have graphics done by Daron's father, Vartan Malakian, who also designed the cover-art for System of a Down's double album Mezmerize/Hypnotize. This guitar was a limited-run-model, with only 300 issues made available worldwide.

References

DMM1